Volino is a village in the municipality of Debarca, North Macedonia. It used to be part of the former municipality of Mešeišta.

Demographics
According to the 2002 census, the village had a total of 462 inhabitants. Ethnic groups in the village include:

Macedonians 462

Sports
Local football club FK Sateska plays in the Macedonian Third League (Southwest Division).

References

Villages in Debarca Municipality